Naysila Nafulany Mirdad or better known as Naysila Mirdad (born in Jakarta, Indonesia on 23 May 1988) is an Indonesian actress of mixed Dutch, Sangirese, Minahasan and Javanese descent.

Filmography

Soap operas

FTV

 Bingkisan Tujuh Belasan
 Sumi Benci Bule
 Kisah Cinta Samaria
 Untukmu Seluruh Nafas Ini
 Jodoh Pilihan Untuk Ustadz
 Sebaris Ayat
 Bawalah Pergi Cintaku
 Allah Tau Siapa Yang Aku Sayang
 Skandal Cinta
 Nikah pada Pandangan Pertama
 Rindu Sang Ibu
 Jodoh Titipan Tante

Advertisements
 Sozzis
 Krim Ekonomi Putih
 Fanbo
 Coca-Cola
 PLN
 TV Panasonic Viera
 Suzuki Swift
 Bodrex
 Mountea
 Real Good
 Toyota Kijang Innova
 Indomie
 Indomilk
 Bank BRI Syariah
 Lasegar
 Sunsilk
 Citra
 Citroën
 Ambeven
 Colidan
 Diapet
 Mylanta
 Polysilane
 Promag

Achievement and nominations 

 2007: Commendable Actress (television) Festival Film Bandung 2007
 2007: Actress most favorite nomination Panasonic Awards 2007
 2009: Actress most favorite nomination Panasonic Awards 2009
 2010: Actress most favorite nomination Panasonic Gobel Awards 2010
 2011: Actress most favorite nomination Panasonic Gobel Awards 2011
 2012: Actress most favorite nomination Panasonic Gobel Awards 2012
 2014: Couple Soap opera most popular Silet Awards 2014 with Ringgo Agus Rahman in soap opera Kita Nikah Yuk
 2016: Nominations woman most favorite celebrity Insert Fashion Awards 2016
 2016: Nominations woman commendable cast of serial television film festival bandung 2016
 2016: Lead Actress most popular nomination SCTV Awards 2016

Clip video 

 ST 12 - Isabella
 Kenang Mirdad dan Ederra - Sedap Betul

Personal life 

Naysila Mirdad was raised in a multi-faith family. Her father Jamal Mirdad is a Sunni Muslim whilst her mother Lydia Kandou is a Protestant Christian. Their sons were raised as Muslims, while their daughters were raised as Christians. There are speculations by the media that Naysila had converted to Islam because she was dating Roestiandi Tsamanov. However she broke up with Roestiandi and started dating Arfito Hutagalung in May 2022.

References

External links 

 

Living people
1988 births
People from Jakarta
Indonesian actresses
Indonesian people of Dutch descent
Indo people
Javanese people
Minahasa people
People of Sangirese descent